Jai Bhim (alternatively spelled Jay Bhim or Jai Bheem) is a slogan and greeting used by followers of B. R. Ambedkar, an Indian scholar, social reformer and the chief architect of the Constitution of India. It refers to Ambedkar's given name Bhimrao . In 1935, Jai Bhim conceived and developed by Babu L. N. Hardas (1904–1939), a staunch follower of Babasaheb Ambedkar, and the secretary of Samata Sainik Dal. However, its origin is obscure and may date as far back as 1818, well before Ambedkar's birth.

Jai Bhim is also called as a slogan by some political parties like the Bahujan Samaj Party (BSP), Republican Party of India (RPI).

History 

The slogan 'Jai Bhim' was given by Babu Hardas in 1935. It is recorded that Babu Hardas L. N. (Laxman Nagarale) himself gave the slogan of 'Jai Bhim' in Ramchandra Kshirsagar's book Dalit Movement in India and Its Leaders. In 1938, a meeting was held at Makranpur in Kannad taluka of Aurangabad district by Bhausaheb More, an activist of the Ambedkarite movement. In this meeting, Dr. Babasaheb Ambedkar was also present. In that meeting, More told the people that from now on, we will only say 'Jai Bhim' while greeting each other. Former Judge and scholar of the Dalit movement Suresh Ghorpade said, "The salutation 'Jai Bhim' started during Dr. Ambedkar's lifetime. Activists of the Ambedkarite movement used to call each other 'Jai Bhim' but some activists also directly salutated Dr. Ambedkar as 'Jai Bhim'."

Dr. Narendra Jadhav says, "The slogan of Jai Bhim was given by Babu Hardas. It is an important triumph for all Dalits. 'Jai Bhim' has become a symbol of struggle, it has become a cultural identity as well as a political identity, it also shows the relationship with the Ambedkarite movement, this utterance has become a symbol of all kinds of identities. I think 'Jai Bhim' has become the overall identity of the revolution,"said Uttam Kamble.

In 1946, on the occasion of the birthday celebrations of Dr. Bhimrao  Ambedkar, for the time in the presence of Dr. Ambedkar, Jai Bhim was proclaimed by Dalit Poet Bihari Lal Harit (1913–1999) through a poem in Gandhi Ground, Opp. Old Delhi Railway Station. It fell into controversy in February 2009 after Dar-ul Uloom Islamic seminary issued a fatwa declaring the slogan "un-Islamic" and "violative of Shariat."

Popular culture 

Millions of songs are sung on the word 'Jai Bhim' in Maharashtra.

The meaning of 'Jai Bhim' is explained in the 2021 Tamil film Jai Bhim, which is dedicated to Ambedkar. It says,
Jai Bhim means light....
Jai Bhim means love....
Jai Bhim means journey
From darkness to light....
Jai Bhim means tears
Of billions of people!

See also 
 Jai Bhim Comrade
 Jai Bhim (2021 film)

Notes 

Greeting words and phrases of India
Dalit culture
B. R. Ambedkar
Slogans